Pichhore may refer to:

Towns in Madhya Pradesh, India
 Pichhore, Gwalior
 Pichhore, Shivpuri